The Military ranks of the Republic of China are the ranks used by the Republic of China Armed Forces. The official military rank names in Traditional Chinese are identical across all different military branches, but their English translations may be different.

Commissioned officer ranks
The rank insignia of commissioned officers.

Other ranks
The rank insignia of non-commissioned officers and enlisted personnel.

Historic ranks 

The rank system of the Republic of China Armed Forces was originally based on the Wehrmacht of Germany (Weimar Republic and early era of Nazi Germany) during the era of Sino-German cooperation in the 1930s. Due to German influence, today’s rank of a one-star General or Admiral does not use the French-style title of Brigadier General, but the German-style title of Major General (Army, Air force and Marines) or Rear Admiral (Navy).

After the government of the Republic of China relocated to Taiwan in December 1949, the military rank system had a large reform in 1956. As a result, the contemporary rank structure is closer to the one used by the United States Armed Forces.

Generalissimo was the highest military rank of the Armed Forces. It was bestowed only once, to Chiang Kai-shek in 1935. This rank was abolished in 2000.

The rank of full general was designed for the Chief of the General Staff and some senior military strategy advisors in the Office of the President. Since 2013, the new regulations had all these positions be with lower rank generals. The rank of full general will be granted only in wartime.

Officer rank

Other ranks

See also 
 Ministry of National Defense (Republic of China)
 Republic of China Armed Forces
 Comparative ranks of Nazi Germany
 Military ranks and insignia of the Japan Self-Defense Forces
 Singapore Armed Forces ranks

Notes

References

Citations

Sources

External links 
 

Military ranks of the Republic of China
Rank insignia